Drowning is the debut EP and release from female fronted industrial metal act, Lahannya.

Track listing
1 - Drowning – 3:24 
2 - Narcotic – 3:38 
3 - Losing Yourself – 5:30 
4 - Drowning (reprise) – 3:58

Lahannya albums
2000 EPs